The Applegate Trail was an emigrant trail through the present-day U.S. states of Idaho, Nevada, California, and Oregon used in the mid-19th century by emigrants on the American frontier. It was originally intended as a less dangerous alternative to the Oregon Trail by which to reach the Oregon Territory. Much of the route was coterminous with the California Trail.

Background

In 1843, part of the Applegate family of Missouri headed west along the Oregon Trail to the Oregon Country. Brothers Charles, Jesse, and Lindsay led their families through many hardships along the trail, including the loss of two children on the journey down the Columbia River. These experiences influenced the family to find an easier and safer way to the Willamette Valley.

In 1846, the Oregon Provisional Legislature allowed the Applegates and others to attempt to find a more southerly route to Oregon. The group began the trek on June 25, 1846, with Jesse Applegate, Lindsay Applegate, David Goff, John Owen, B. F. Burch, W. Sportsman, Robert Smith, a Mr. Goodhue, J. Jones, B. Ausbuan, and Levi Scott starting the survey. Leaving La Creole, the party spent three and a half months surveying a route to Fort Hall in present-day Idaho. At that location, the Applegate Trail departed the main branch of the Oregon Trail. On the return trip, the group brought approximately 150 immigrants along the new southern route, also known as the South Road, South Emigrant Trail or the Scott-Applegate Trail.

Route

From Fort Hall, the route headed south following the Humboldt River before passing through the Black Rock Desert in present-day Nevada. The trail then entered Northern California and passed Goose and Tule lakes. After crossing the Lost River, the route then crossed the Klamath Basin and the Cascade Range into Southern Oregon. The trail followed Keene Creek to the Siskiyou Mountains, then Bear Creek and the Rogue River. Heading north from there, the route crossed the Umpqua River before crossing the Calapooya Mountains into the southern Willamette Valley.

Subsequent history

After the initial party traveled the trail, it continued to be used and improved over the next few decades. In 1848, when news of the California Gold Rush reached the Willamette Valley, many settlers including Jesse and Lindsay Applegate left Oregon for the gold fields and used the trail to reach northern California. On August 3, 1992, the Applegate Trail became a National Historic Trail as part of the California National Historic Trail. The Nevada section of the trail is listed on the National Register of Historic Places as the Applegate-Lassen Trail.

See also

Barlow Road
Huntington Wagon Road
Meek Cutoff
Mormon Trail
Oregon-California Trails Association
Oregon Historic Trails Advisory Council
Santiam Wagon Road

References

External links

History of the Applegate Trail
Applegate-Lassen Route at California - Nevada Chapter of the Oregon-California Trails Association (OCTA)
Deaths and Graves On The Applegate-Lassen Trail  at California - Nevada Chapter of the Oregon-California Trails Association (OCTA)

California Trail
Oregon Trail
Oregon Territory
Historic trails and roads in California
Historic trails and roads in Idaho
Historic trails and roads in Nevada
Historic trails and roads in Oregon
History of the Great Basin
Black Rock Desert
Modoc Plateau
National Register of Historic Places in Humboldt County, Nevada
National Register of Historic Places in Pershing County, Nevada
Transportation in Humboldt County, Nevada
Transportation in Jackson County, Oregon
Transportation in Klamath County, Oregon
Transportation in Modoc County, California
Transportation in Pershing County, Nevada
1846 establishments in Alta California
1846 establishments in Oregon Country
Roads on the National Register of Historic Places in Nevada
Historic districts on the National Register of Historic Places in Nevada